Untamed is a Rocky Mountain Construction hybrid steel-wood roller coaster at Walibi Holland, a theme park in the Netherlands. Untamed replaced Robin Hood, a wooden roller coaster that closed on 28 October 2018.

History

Robin Hood 
Robin Hood was a coaster designed by Stand Company and was built by Vekoma. The ride opened in 2000 and had a capacity of 815 people per hour, operating two trains carrying 24 people. Robin Hood closed on 28 October 2018, for a makeover from Rocky Mountain Construction.

Untamed 
Construction for Untamed began in late October 2018. The track of Robin Hood was removed along with some parts of the wooden construction. Also, all previous theming elements were taken down. The new track was finished on 16 May 2019. Test rides started three weeks later on 3 June 2019. Untamed opened on 1 July 2019.

Characteristics 
The coaster keeps the record for most inversions on a hybrid coaster, namely 5. During the ride, there are 14 airtime moments. The layout features a unique element called a 270 degrees Double Inverting Corner Stall which consists of two inversions right after each other. The element is located in the first turn, right after the first drop.

In the queue line of Untamed, several remnants of Robin Hood can be found, such as track parts and an old train cart.

Untamed has a wilderness theming and the trains are designed to look like an insect.

Comparison

Reception and records
Untamed was ranked in the Amusement Today's Golden Ticket Awards for best new roller coaster of 2019 in fifth place.

References

2000 establishments in the Netherlands
2019 establishments in the Netherlands
Hybrid roller coasters
Roller coasters in the Netherlands
Roller coasters introduced in 2000
Roller coasters introduced in 2019
Roller coasters manufactured by Rocky Mountain Construction
Roller coasters manufactured by Vekoma
Walibi Holland
Wooden roller coasters
21st-century architecture in the Netherlands